SpaceX CRS-11, also known as SpX-11, was a Commercial Resupply Service mission to the International Space Station, launched successfully on 3 June 2017. The mission was contracted by NASA and was flown by SpaceX. The mission utilized a Falcon 9 launch vehicle and was the first reuse of C106, a CRS Dragon cargo vessel that was previously flown on the CRS-4 mission.

CRS-11 was the penultimate of the first twelve missions awarded to SpaceX under the Commercial Resupply Services contract to resupply the International Space Station.

Rocket and spacecraft 

The CRS-11 mission was the first time that a Dragon spacecraft has been reused, helping SpaceX to scale back its production line and shift focus to Dragon 2.

CRS-11 launched aboard a Falcon 9 launch vehicle on 3 June 2017 at 21:07:38 UTC from Kennedy Space Center's Launch Complex 39A (LC-39A). The spacecraft rendezvoused with the station on 5 June 2017 and conducted a series of orbit adjustment burns to match speed, altitude, and orientation with the ISS. After arriving at the capture point at 13:37 UTC, the vehicle was snared at 13:52 UTC by the Canadarm2, operated by Peggy Whitson and Jack Fischer. It was berthed to the Harmony module at 16:07 UTC.

The Falcon 9 first stage landed successfully on Landing Zone 1, making it the fifth successful touch down on land and the 11th overall.

The CRS-11 Dragon remained attached to the ISS for just over 27 days. It was moved to its release position by Canadarm2, but poor sea conditions forced a delay to the following day. On 3 July 2017, at 06:41 UTC, crew members commanded Canadarm2 to release Dragon, and soon after the spacecraft began a series of thruster firings to move it away from the station. About five hours after departing from ISS, Dragon closed its guidance, navigation, and control (GNC) bay door and conducted a 10-minute deorbit burn. Immediately after, the spacecraft jettisoned its cargo trunk and oriented itself for reentry. Dragon splashed down in the Pacific Ocean off Baja California at 12:12 UTC.

Payload 
NASA has contracted for the CRS-11 mission from SpaceX and therefore determines the primary payload, date/time of launch, and orbital parameters for the Dragon space capsule.

The following is a breakdown of cargo bound for the ISS:

 Science investigations: 
 Advanced Plant Habitat (APH) - a NASA- and ORBITEC-developed payload built in Madison, Wisconsin. APH is a fully automated facility that is used to conduct plant bioscience research on the ISS.
 Crew supplies: 
 Vehicle hardware: 
 Spacewalk equipment: 
 Computer resources: 
 External payloads:
 Roll Out Solar Array (ROSA): 
 Neutron Star Interior Composition Explorer (NICER): 
 Multiple User System for Earth Sensing (MUSES): 

A constellation of five CubeSats was also carried on the mission as part of Birds-1, one each from the countries of Japan, Nigeria, Bangladesh, Ghana, and Mongolia. The satellites from Bangladesh (BRAC ONNESHA), Ghana (GhanaSat-1), and Mongolia (Mazaalai) were those countries' first satellites in space.

See also 
 Uncrewed spaceflights to the International Space Station
 List of Falcon 9 and Falcon Heavy launches
 2017 in spaceflight

References

External links 
 
 Dragon website at SpaceX.com
 Commercial Resupply Services at nasa.gov

SpaceX Dragon
Spacecraft launched in 2017
Spacecraft which reentered in 2017
SpaceX payloads contracted by NASA
Supply vehicles for the International Space Station